Maria Branwell (15 April 1783 – 15 September 1821) is best known as being the mother of British writers Emily Brontë, Anne Brontë, Charlotte Brontë and of their brother Branwell Brontë, who was a poet and painter. Maria married Patrick Brontë on 29 December 1812.

Early life

Maria Branwell was the eighth child of twelve born to Anne Carne and Thomas Branwell in Penzance, Cornwall, although only five daughters and one son grew to adulthood. Thomas Branwell was a successful merchant and owned many properties throughout the town. The men of the Branwell family took part in the town's public life. Maria's brother Benjamin was mayor in 1809. 

The family were prominent Methodists. Thomas' sister and two of his daughters married clergymen of Wesleyan leanings: his sister Jane married John Fennell in 1790; his daughter Jane Branwell married John Kingston in 1800; and Maria married Patrick Brontë in 1812. The first Wesleyan Methodist chapel was built in Penzance in 1814, and the Branwells were instrumental in having this built.

Courtship and marriage
Maria met Patrick Brontë in 1812 when visiting her aunt Jane (her father's sister) and uncle John Fennell in Yorkshire after four family deaths between 1808 and 1812, including both of her parents. Maria moved to Yorkshire to help her aunt with the household management of a new Methodist training school. John Fennell, a former schoolmaster and Methodist class leader in Penzance and Wellington, Shropshire, was appointed headmaster of the newly opened Woodhouse Grove School at Rawdon, for the sons of Methodist ministers in 1812. Patrick, during his curacy in Wellington, had known John Fennell in Shropshire's Wesleyan circles.

When Fennell was invited to the Yorkshire headship, he needed external examiners for his students and invited Patrick to serve in that capacity at Woodhouse Grove. Maria and Patrick 'loved at first sight' and married within the year. They were married on 29 December 1812 at Guiseley Parish Church by mutual friend Reverend William Morgan, who, on the same day, married Jane and John Fennell's daughter, Jane Branwell Fennell. 

Befitting the close family that the Branwells were, also married on that day at the same hour were Maria's youngest sister, Charlotte, to her cousin Joseph Branwell at the parish church of Madron in Cornwall.

Later life
Maria and Patrick's first home was Clough House in Hightown. Their first two children, Maria and Elizabeth, were born there in 1813/1814 and 1815. Their second home was in Thornton, where their remaining children were born: 

 Charlotte (1816)
 Patrick Branwell (1817)
 Emily Jane (1818)
 Anne (1820) 

In 1820 the Brontës moved to Haworth. After moving to Haworth, Maria sickened with what may have been uterine or ovarian cancer, or chronic pelvic sepsis and anaemia brought on by the birth of her youngest daughter Anne. Whatever the cause, Maria died seven and half months later, suffering a long agony; Anne was only twenty months old. 

Maria was buried on 22 September 1821 at Haworth. William Morgan performed the burial ceremony.

Works
The only work besides letters that Maria wrote was the essay "The Advantages of Poverty, In Religious Concerns." The essay can be found in the book Life and Letters by Clement Shorter.

See also

Brontë family

References

External links 
Background and Early Life of Maria Branwell at Victorian Era England & Life Of Victorians

Maria Branwell - Mother of the Brontë sisters at The Cornwall Guide

1783 births
1821 deaths
18th-century English people
19th-century English non-fiction writers
18th-century British women
19th-century English women writers
19th-century English writers
British women essayists
Brontë family
Women of the Regency era
Writers from Cornwall
People from Penzance
Cornish Methodists
Deaths from ovarian cancer
English essayists